Rayo Vallecano de Madrid B is the reserve team of Rayo Vallecano, a Spanish football club based in the Madrid neighbourhood of Vallecas. Founded in 1973 and plays in Tercera Federación – Group 7, holding home matches at Ciudad Deportiva Rayo Vallecano, with a 2,500-seat capacity.

Season to season
As a farm team

As a reserve team

4 seasons in Segunda División B
30 seasons in Tercera División
2 seasons in Tercera Federación

Players

Current squad

Current technical staff

Notable players

Note: This list includes players that have appeared in at least 100 top league games and/or have reached international status.

References

External links
Official website 
Futbolme team profile 
Rayo Herald – Updated club info 

Football clubs in Madrid
Rayo Vallecano
Association football clubs established in 1956
Spanish reserve football teams
1956 establishments in Spain